Bapusaheb Gorthekar Deshmukh is a politician and a former Nanded District President of the Nationalist Congress Party, and son of Balajirao Gopalrao Gorthekar Deshmukh. He was a Member of the Maharashtra Legislative Assembly from the Bhokar constituency.

He Contested an Assembly election against Ashok Chavan in 2019 from Bhokar as BJP Candidate.

References

Year of birth missing (living people)
Living people
Bharatiya Janata Party politicians from Maharashtra
Nationalist Congress Party politicians from Maharashtra
People from Nanded district